The 8th Washington D.C. Area Film Critics Association Awards were given on December 7, 2009.

Winners and nominees
Best Film
 Up in the Air
 The Hurt Locker
 Inglourious Basterds
 Precious
 Up

Best Director
 Kathryn Bigelow – The Hurt Locker
 Lee Daniels – Precious
 Clint Eastwood – Invictus
 Jason Reitman – Up in the Air
 Quentin Tarantino – Inglourious Basterds

Best Actor
 George Clooney – Up in the Air
 Colin Firth – A Single Man
 Morgan Freeman – Invictus
 Viggo Mortensen – The Road
 Jeremy Renner – The Hurt Locker

Best Actress
 Carey Mulligan – An Education
 Sandra Bullock – The Blind Side
 Maya Rudolph – Away We Go
 Gabourey Sidibe – Precious
 Meryl Streep – Julie & Julia

Best Supporting Actor
 Christoph Waltz – Inglourious Basterds
 Woody Harrelson – The Messenger
 Anthony Mackie – The Hurt Locker
 Alfred Molina – An Education
 Stanley Tucci – Lovely Bones

Best Supporting Actress
 Mo'Nique – Precious
 Vera Farmiga – Up in the Air
 Anna Kendrick – Up in the Air
 Julianne Moore – A Single Man
 Samantha Morton – The Messenger

Best Adapted Screenplay
 Up in the Air – Jason Reitman and Sheldon Turner An Education – Nick Hornby
 The Blind Side – John Lee Hancock
 Precious – Geoffrey S. Fletcher
 The Road – Joe PenhallBest Original Screenplay Inglourious Basterds – Quentin Tarantino (500) Days of Summer – Scott Neustadter and Michael H. Weber
 The Hurt Locker – Mark Boal
 A Serious Man – Joel Coen and Ethan Coen
 Up – Pete Docter, Bob Peterson, and Tom McCarthyBest Breakthrough Performance Gabourey Sidibe – Precious
 Anna Kendrick – Up in the Air
 Christian McKay – Me and Orson Welles
 Carey Mulligan – An Education
 Jeremy Renner – The Hurt LockerBest Cast The Hurt Locker
 Nine
 Precious
 Star Trek
 Up in the Air

Best Animated Film
 Up
 9
 Coraline
 Fantastic Mr. Fox
 Ponyo

Best Documentary Film
 Food, Inc.
 Anvil! The Story of Anvil
 Capitalism: A Love Story
 The Cove
 Good Hair

Best Foreign Language Film
 Sin Nombre • Mexico
 Broken Embraces • Spain
 Red Cliff • China
 Summer Hours • France
 The White Ribbon • Austria-Germany

Best Art Direction
 Nine
 Lovely Bones
 Star Trek
 Where the Wild Things Are
 The Young Victoria

References

External links
 The Washington D.C. Area Film Critics Association

2009
2009 film awards